Pedro Mujica Carassa was a Peruvian politician in the early 20th century. He was the mayor of Lima from 1920 to 1921.

Mayors of Lima
Mujica
Year of birth missing
Year of death missing